Adam Perry may refer to:

 Adam Perry (drummer) (born 1969), English drummer
 Adam Perry (rugby league) (born 1979), Australian rugby player

See also 
 Perry (disambiguation)